Vanadium(III) fluoride is the chemical compound with the formula VF3. This yellow-green, refractory solid is obtained in a two-step procedure from V2O3.
Similar to other transition-metal fluorides (such as MnF2), it exhibits magnetic ordering at low temperatures (e.g. V2F6.4H2O orders below 12 K).

Preparation
The first step entails conversion to the hexafluorovanadate(III) salt using ammonium bifluoride:
V2O3 + 6 (NH4)HF2 → 2 (NH4)3VF6 + 3 H2O

In the second step, the hexafluorovanadate is thermally decomposed.
(NH4)3VF6 → 3 NH3 + 3 HF + VF3

The thermal decomposition of ammonium salts is a relatively common method for the preparation of inorganic solids.

VF3 can also be prepared by treatment of V2O3 with HF.
VF3 is a crystalline solid with 6 coordinate vanadium atoms with bridging fluorine atoms. The magnetic moment indicates the presence of two unpaired electrons.

References

Fluorides
Metal halides
Vanadium(III) compounds